David G. Binney (November 3, 1940 – October 4, 2008) was an American FBI agent who served as Deputy Director of the Federal Bureau of Investigation in 1994.

References

1940 births
2008 deaths
Deputy Directors of the Federal Bureau of Investigation